Aspidiotus is a genus of armoured scale insects. It includes several agricultural and horticultural pests.

A. destructor was originally blamed for a massive die-off of coconut trees in the Philippines which began about 2009. It has been involved previously in die-offs in Indonesia. In July 2014, following a detailed morphological review, scientists announced that instead A. rigidus, was to blame. A. rigidus has few natural predators in the Philippines which leads to the surging infestation.

Species

Aspidiotus anningensis Tang & Chu, 1983
Aspidiotus artus Munting, 1971
Aspidiotus atomarius (Hall, 1946)
Aspidiotus atripileus Munting, 1971
Aspidiotus beilschmiediae Takagi, 1969
Aspidiotus brachystegiae Hall, 1928
Aspidiotus capensis Newstead, 1917
Aspidiotus cerasi  Fitch, 1857
Aspidiotus chamaeropsis Signoret, 1869
Aspidiotus chinensis Kuwana & Muramatsu, 1931
Aspidiotus cryptomeriae Kuwana, 1902 - Sugi scale
Aspidiotus destructor Cockerell in Fernald, 1903 - coconut scale
Aspidiotus hedericola Leonardi, 1920
Aspidiotus nerii Bouché, 1833 - oleander scale, worldwide distribution, originated in Europe
Aspidiotus rigidus Reyne, 1947
Aspidiotus taiyuanensis (Feng, 2011)
Aspidiotus zizyphi Hall, 1929

Former species

 Aspidiotus abieticola Koroneos, 1934 synonym for Dynaspidiotus abieticola (Koroneos, 1934)
 Aspidiotus hederae Leonardi, 1898 synonym for Aspidiotus nerii Bouché, 1833
 Aspidiotus ostreaeformis Curtis, 1843 synonym for Diaspidiotus ostreaeformis (Curtis, 1843)

References

Endemic fauna of the Philippines
Aspidiotina
Sternorrhyncha genera